Khatlon Valley is a valley in Tajikistan.

See also 
 Khatlon Region

References 

Valleys of Tajikistan